Neli Irman (born 7 April 1986) is a Slovenian handball player for Spono Eagles and the Slovenian national team.

References

1986 births
Living people
Sportspeople from Celje
Slovenian female handball players
Expatriate handball players
Slovenian expatriate sportspeople in Croatia
Slovenian expatriate sportspeople in Montenegro
Slovenian expatriate sportspeople in Switzerland
Mediterranean Games competitors for Slovenia
Competitors at the 2005 Mediterranean Games